The anterior talofibular ligament is a ligament in the ankle.
It passes from the anterior margin of the fibular malleolus, passing anteromedially to insert at the lateral aspect of the talus at the talar neck , in front of its lateral articular facet. It is one of the lateral ligaments of the ankle and prevents the foot from sliding forward in relation to the shin. It is the most commonly injured ligament in a sprained ankle—from an inversion injury—and will allow a positive anterior drawer test of the ankle if completely torn.

See also
 Sprained ankle
 Posterior talofibular ligament

References

Further reading

External links
  - "Lateral view of the ligaments of the ankle."
 

Ligaments of the lower limb